Gustav Hrubý (born 18 April 1916, date of death unknown) was a Czech gymnast. He competed in eight events at the 1948 Summer Olympics.

References

External links
 

1916 births
Year of death missing
Czech male artistic gymnasts
Olympic gymnasts of Czechoslovakia
Gymnasts at the 1948 Summer Olympics
Sportspeople from Vienna